Borja González Tomás (born 25 August 1992), known as Borja Bastón, is a Spanish professional footballer who plays as a striker for Segunda División club Real Oviedo.

Trained at Atlético Madrid, he spent much of his tenure out on loan and with Atlético Madrid B, this included successful spells at Deportivo and Zaragoza in the Segunda División and Eibar in La Liga. In 2016 he signed with Swansea City, being loaned twice during his contract.

Borja earned 29 caps and scored 19 goals for Spain at youth level, finishing as top scorer at the 2009 U-17 World Cup and winning the European Under-19 Championship two years later.

Club career

Atlético Madrid
Born in Madrid, Bastón arrived in his hometown club Atlético Madrid's youth system at the age of four. He began as a goalkeeper, the position which his father played professionally, but he converted him to a forward so that he could enjoy the game more. He made his senior debut in the 2009–10 season, scoring 12 goals for the reserve team in the Segunda División B.

On 15 May 2010, in the campaign's last round, Bastón made his first-team and La Liga debut, coming on as a substitute for Tiago in the 58th minute of the match against Getafe. Twenty minutes later, however, he was stretchered off with a serious anterior cruciate ligament injury on his left knee, in an eventual 0–3 home loss.

Bastón re-appeared with Atlético B seven months after his injury, as a substitute in a 1–0 win over Cacereño. After the match, he stated: "I'm very happy. I've passed really bad times and I've suffered, but now I'm prepared to help the team go up in the league table."

In late August 2011 Bastón was loaned to Real Murcia, recently promoted to the Segunda División. On 30 August of the following year he moved to Huesca also in a temporary deal, scoring nine times for the latter during the season as it ended in relegation. On 27 January 2013, he netted in a 2–1 victory at Numancia but was also sent off for a second yellow card.

On 28 August 2013, Bastón joined Deportivo de La Coruña on a two-year loan. After helping his team return to the top flight at the first attempt, he moved to fellow league club Real Zaragoza also in a temporary deal, scoring 22 goals in the regular season, contributing to his team's run to the promotion play-off final and earning a spot in the Team of the Season.

Bastón was loaned to Eibar of the top tier on 31 July 2015. He scored his first goals in the competition on 23 September, helping to a 2–2 draw at Levante. He was named the La Liga Player of the Month for October, for his goals against Las Palmas, Sevilla and Barcelona.

Swansea City
On 11 August 2016, Swansea City signed Bastón on a four-year contract for a club record fee of £15.5 million. He made his debut in the Premier League on 18 September under Francesco Guidolin, replacing Jack Cork for the final eight minutes of a 1–0 loss at Southampton. He scored his first goal on 15 October again off the bench, in a 3–2 defeat away to Arsenal in new manager Bob Bradley's first game in charge.

Having started just four matches and having not contributed any more goals as the Swans avoided relegation, Bastón entered talks in May 2017 with manager Paul Clement and the board of directors over his future. On 4 July 2017, he was loaned to Málaga in the Spanish top division for one year; both sides were eventually relegated. 

Bastón was loaned again on 16 July 2018, joining Alavés. Back at Swansea for the 2019–20 season, he scored his first goal for them since 2016 in a 2–1 win against Hull City in the first league fixture on 3 August 2019.

Aston Villa
On 31 January 2020, Bastón joined Aston Villa on a free transfer, leaving Swansea six months before the end of his contract in order to remove himself from their wage bill. Sixteen days after signing, he made his debut as a late substitute in a 3–2 home defeat to Tottenham Hotspur.

Bastón was released on 25 June 2020.

Leganés and Oviedo
On 6 September 2020, Bastón agreed to a one-year deal with Leganés, recently relegated to the second tier. On 11 August 2021, he moved to Real Oviedo of the same league on a two-year contract.

International career
Bastón represented Spain's under-17 at the 2009 FIFA World Cup in Nigeria. As the national team finally finished in third position he won the Golden Boot with five goals, with teammate Sergi Roberto adding three.

With the under-19 team, Bastón won the 2011 UEFA European Championship in Romania, but was a support player in a side favouring Álvaro Morata and Juanmi.

Personal life
Bastón's father, Miguel Bastón, was also a footballer. A goalkeeper, he also played with Atlético – but only with their reserves – and spent most of his career with Real Burgos.

Career statistics

Honours
Spain U17
FIFA U-17 World Cup third place: 2009

Spain U19
UEFA European Under-19 Championship: 2011

Individual
Pichichi Trophy (Segunda División): 2021–22 (22 goals)
FIFA U-17 World Cup Golden Boot: 2009
La Liga Player of the Month: October 2015

References

External links

1992 births
Living people
Spanish footballers
Footballers from Madrid
Association football forwards
La Liga players
Segunda División players
Segunda División B players
Atlético Madrid B players
Atlético Madrid footballers
Real Murcia players
SD Huesca footballers
Deportivo de La Coruña players
Real Zaragoza players
SD Eibar footballers
Málaga CF players
Deportivo Alavés players
CD Leganés players
Real Oviedo players
Premier League players
English Football League players
Swansea City A.F.C. players
Aston Villa F.C. players
Spain youth international footballers
Spanish expatriate footballers
Expatriate footballers in Wales
Expatriate footballers in England
Spanish expatriate sportspeople in Wales
Spanish expatriate sportspeople in England